Coyotepec is a municipality in the Mexican state of Puebla. The name comes from the Nahuatl words coyotl (coyote) and tepetl (hill) 

References

Municipalities of Puebla